Titanium aluminide (chemical formula TiAl), commonly gamma titanium, is an intermetallic chemical compound. It is lightweight and resistant to oxidation  and heat, but has low ductility. The density of γ-TiAl is about 4.0 g/cm3. It finds use in several applications including aircraft, jet engines, sporting equipment and automobiles. The development of TiAl based alloys began circa 1970. The alloys have been used in these applications only since about 2000.

Titanium aluminide has three major intermetallic compounds: gamma titanium aluminide (gamma TiAl, γ-TiAl), alpha 2-Ti3Al and TiAl3. Among the three, gamma TiAl has received the most interest and applications.

Applications of gamma-TiAl

Gamma TiAl has excellent mechanical properties and oxidation and corrosion resistance at elevated temperatures (over 600°C), which makes it a possible replacement for traditional Ni based superalloy components in aircraft turbine engines.

TiAl-based alloys have potential to increase the thrust-to-weight ratio in aircraft engines. This is especially the case with the engine's low-pressure turbine blades and the high-pressure compressor blades. These are traditionally made of Ni-based superalloy, which is nearly twice as dense as TiAl-based alloys.  Some gamma titanium aluminide alloys retain strength and oxidation resistance to 1000 °C, which is 400 °C higher than the operating temperature limit of conventional titanium alloys.

General Electric uses gamma TiAl for the low-pressure turbine blades on its GEnx engine, which powers the Boeing 787 and Boeing 747-8 aircraft. This was the first large-scale use of this material on a commercial jet engine when it entered service in 2011.  The TiAl LPT blades are cast by Precision Castparts Corp. and Avio s.p.a. Machining of the Stage 6, and Stage 7 LPT blades is performed by Moeller Manufacturing. An alternate pathway for production of the gamma TiAl blades for the GEnx and GE9x engines using additive manufacturing is being explored.

In 2019 a new 55g lightweight version of the Omega Seamaster wristwatch was made, using gamma titanium aluminide for the case, backcase and crown, and a titanium dial and mechanism in Ti 6/4 (grade 5). The retail price of this watch at £37,240 was nine times that of the basic Seamaster and comparable to the top of the range platinum-cased version with a moonphase complication.

Alpha 2-Ti3Al

TiAl3
TiAl3 has the lowest density of 3.4 g/cm3, the highest micro hardness of 465–670 kg/mm2 and the best oxidation resistance even at 1 000 °C. However, the applications of TiAl3 in the engineering and aerospace fields are limited by its poor ductility. In addition, the loss of ductility at ambient temperature is usually accompanied by a change of fracture mode from ductile transgranular to brittle intergranular or to brittle cleavage. Despite the fact that a lot of toughening strategies have been developed to improve their toughness, machining quality is still a difficult problem to tackle. Near-net shape manufacturing technology is considered as one of the best choices for preparing such materials. {date=July 2022}

References

External links
 Machining Gamma Titanium Aluminide Components - Moeller Manufacturing
 Titanium Aluminide Applications in the HighSpeed Civil Transport
 Titanium Aluminides - Intermetallics on azom.com.
 Power House (GEnx TiAl LPT Blade Announcement)

Aluminides
Titanium alloys
Intermetallics